The 1921–22 Sussex County Football League season was the second in the history of the competition.

League table
The league featured 12 clubs, 10 which competed in the last season, along with two new clubs:
 Eastbourne Royal Engineers
 Hastings and St Leonards

League table

References

1921-22
9